The 2017–18 UEFA Youth League knockout phase (play-offs and round of 16 onwards) began on 6 February 2018 and concluded on 23 April 2018 with the final at Colovray Stadium in Nyon, Switzerland, to decide the champions of the 2017–18 UEFA Youth League. A total of 24 teams competed in the knockout phase.

Times up to 24 March 2018 (play-offs, round of 16 and quarter-finals) are CET (UTC+1), thereafter times (semi-finals and final) are CEST (UTC+2).

Round and draw dates
The schedule of the knockout phase (play-offs and round of 16 onwards) is as follows (all draws are held at the UEFA headquarters in Nyon, Switzerland).

Format
The knockout phase (play-offs and round of 16 onwards), played as a single-elimination tournament, involved 24 teams: 16 teams which qualified from the UEFA Champions League Path (eight group winners and eight group runners-up), and eight teams which qualified from the Domestic Champions Path (eight second round winners):
The eight group winners from the UEFA Champions League Path entered the round of 16.
The eight group runners-up from the UEFA Champions League Path and the eight second round winners from the Domestic Champions Path entered the play-offs. The eight play-off winners advanced to the round of 16.

Each tie was played over a single match. If the score was tied after full time, the match was decided by a penalty shoot-out (no extra time was played).

Qualified teams

UEFA Champions League Path

Domestic Champions Path

Play-offs

The draw for the play-offs was held on 11 December 2017, 14:30 CET, at the UEFA headquarters in Nyon, Switzerland. The eight second round winners from the Domestic Champions Path were drawn against the eight group runners-up from the UEFA Champions League Path, with the teams from the Domestic Champions Path hosting the match. Teams from the same association could not be drawn against each other. The eight play-off winners advanced to the round of 16, where they were joined by the eight group winners from the UEFA Champions League Path.

The play-offs were played on 6 and 7 February 2018.

|}

Bracket (round of 16 onwards)

The draw for the round of 16 onwards was held on 9 February 2018, 13:00 CET, at the UEFA headquarters in Nyon, Switzerland. The mechanism of the draws for each round was as follows:
In the draw for the round of 16, there were no seedings, and the 16 teams (eight UEFA Champions League Path group winners and eight play-off winners) were drawn into eight ties. Teams from the same UEFA Champions League Path group could not be drawn against each other, but teams from the same association could be drawn against each other. The draw also decided the home team for each round of 16 match.
In the draws for the quarter-finals onwards, there were no seedings, and teams from the same UEFA Champions League Path group or the same association could be drawn against each other (the identity of all teams were not known at the time of the draw). The draws also decided the home team for each quarter-final, and the "home" team for administrative purposes for each semi-final and final (which were played at a neutral venue).

Round of 16

The round of 16 matches were played on 20 and 21 February 2018.

|}

Quarter-finals

The quarter-finals were played on 13 and 14 March 2018.

|}

Semi-finals

The semi-finals were played on 20 April 2018 at Colovray Stadium, Nyon.

|}

Final

The final was played on 23 April 2018 at Colovray Stadium, Nyon.

References

External links
UEFA Youth League (official website)
UEFA Youth League history: 2017/18

3
February 2018 sports events in Europe
March 2018 sports events in Europe
April 2018 sports events in Europe